Fréderique Robert (born 25 January 1989) is a Belgian former professional cyclist.

Major results

2008
1st Stage 3 Le Triptyque des Monts et Châteaux
2009
4th Omloop van het Houtland
6th Nationale Sluitingsprijs
7th Antwerpse Havenpijl
2010
1st Stage 1 Le Triptyque des Monts et Châteaux
9th Omloop der Kempen
2011
7th Handzame Classic
8th Nationale Sluitingsprijs
9th Scheldeprijs
2012
7th Dwars door Drenthe
7th Dutch Food Valley Classic
2013
La Tropicale Amissa Bongo
1st Stages 1 & 5
7th Grote Prijs Stad Zottegem
2014
La Tropicale Amissa Bongo
1st Stages 6 & 7

References

External links

Official Profile

1989 births
Living people
Belgian male cyclists
People from Mol, Belgium
Cyclists from Antwerp Province